Przemysław Pawlicki (born 5 September 1991) is a Polish  motorcycle speedway rider who is a member of Poland U-21 and U-19 national teams. Pawlicki is a current Team U-21 World Champion and Team U-19 European Champion).

Career history

2008
Przemysław Pawlicki passed his speedway license (Licencja "Ż") in 2008 as a 16-year-old. On 20 July 2008 he rode in his first meeting in the Polish Speedway Ekstraliga (Leszno vs. Wrocław 61:29). On his debut, he scored 11 points (3,3,1,-,3,1) finishing heat 4 in the best time of the day (59.90 sec.). Seven days later, in Tarnów, he only scored one point (1,0,-,-,-,0) for Leszno. In total he rode in 20 heats (5 meetings) and scored 31 points and 3 bonus points (averaging 1.700). Unia Leszno reached the Ekstraliga Final, but lost Unibax Toruń 84:96 (Pawlicki did not start in the final).

Pawlicki participated in the Team Under-21 Polish Championship for Leszno. He was one of the best Leszno riders in "Qualifying Group I" In the Final at the Alfred Smoczyk Stadium, Leszno won the title. Pawlicki scored a maximum 15 points and was the fastest rider in the meeting (60.6 secs in Heat 5). In total, he scored 51 points in 21 heats (averaging 2.429). Leszno won the Under-21 Speedway Ekstraliga (Liga Juniorów) and Pawlicki finished third in the Ekstraliga U-21 Individual Championship (13 points and second in Run-Off).

In the Polish Pairs Under-21 Championship Final he scored 13 (plus one bonus) points, with Leszno finishing fifth. In his first season, he was fourth in the Individual Under-21 Polish Championship, scoring 11 points. He qualified for the Silver U-21 and Bronze U-19 Helmet, but was injured and subsequently replaced.

In the European Club Champions' Cup Semi-Final Unia Leszno nominated juniors and finished last. Pawlicki was Leszno's top scorer with 5 points.

Weekly "Tygodnik Żużlowy" (Speedway Weekly) awarded him as Revelation of the Year. Speedway chapter of Main Commission of Speedway Sport (part of the Polish Motor Union) awarded him and Maciej Janowski for one of the best debut seasons in Polish speedway history.

2009
In 2009 season he again rode for Unia Leszno (Poland). He made his debut in the Individual Polish Championship reaching Quarter-Final 2. He finished 9th and was knocked out of the competition. He rode in two events in German Bundesliga for AC Landshut. His team won in the league final.

On 11 July, Pawlicki rode in the Individual U-19 European Championship Final. He won the title beating Maciej Janowski and Martin Vaculík. On 23 August, Pawlicki and Janowski were top scorers for the Polish team in the Team U-19 European Championship Final helping Poland win the title. On 5 September in Gorzów Wielkopolski the Polish team successfully defended their World Championship title at Under-21 Speedway World Cup. Pawlicki finishing Poland's top scorer with a maximum 15 points.

Three days after the U-21 SWC, Pawlicki crashed during a Junior meeting in Gorzów Wielkopolski. Because of his injury (a broken arm), he could not compete in the Ekstraliga U-21 Individual Championship, Polish Pairs Championship Final, Bronze U-19 & Silver U-21 Helmet Finals, nor Individual U-21 World Championship Final.

Weekly "Tygodnik Żużlowy" (Speedway Weekly) awarded him the Unluckiest Rider of the Year.

2010
On 2 March 2010 Pawlicki's Polish team Unia Leszno announced that he would not be riding for them in the 2010 Speedway Ekstraliga, as Pawlicki could not agree to financial terms of the contract. After qualifying for the Under-21 World Championship Semi-Final, Unia Leszno agreed loan him to Caelum Stal Gorzów.

He rode for Coventry Bees in the British Elite League, Rospiggarna Hallstavik in the Swedish Elitserien, AC Landshut in the Bundesliga and Holsted in the Danish Superliga. He was instrumental in helping Coventry win the Elite League Title, beating Poole 101-79 in the two leg play-off final

Przemysław Pawlicki was nominated to ride in the Domestic Qualification for the 2010 Individual Speedway Junior World Championship, but finished 14th in the Domestic Semi-Final and was knocked out of the competition. After the Domestic Final, national team manager Marek Cieślak, nominated him and Dawid Lampart as a "wild card" for the Under-21 World Championship.

In August 2017, during the Speedway Grand Prix Qualification he won the GP Challenge, which ensured that he claimed a permanent slot for the 2018 Speedway Grand Prix.

In 2023, he signed for Piraterna in the Swedish Elitserien.

Personal life
His father Piotr Pawlicki, Sr. (born 31 July 1963) was also a speedway rider. Przemysław's brother Piotr Pawlicki, Jr. (born 30 November 1994) is also a professional rider.

Career details

World Championships
 Individual U-21 World Championship
 2009 -  Goričan - qualify to the Final, but he was injury
 Team U-21 World Championship (Under-21 World Cup)
 2009 -  Gorzów Wlkp. - U-21 World Champion (15 pts)

European Championships
 Individual U-19 European Championship
 2009 -  Tarnów - European Champion (14 pts)
 2010 -  Goričan - Runner-up (14+2 pts)
 2010 -  Divišov - U-19 European Champion (14 pts)
 Team U-19 European Championship
 2009 -  Holsted - U-19 European Champion (15 pts)
 European Club Champions' Cup
 2008 - 4th place in Semi-Final

Domestic competitions
 Individual Polish Championship
 2009 - 9th place in Quarter-Final 2
 Individual U-21 Polish Championship
 2008 -  Rybnik - 4th place (11 ps)
 2009 -  Leszno - 5th place (9 pts)
 Polish Pairs Junior Championship
 2009 -  Rybnik - U-21 Polish Champion (17 pts)
 Team Polish Championship (League)
 2008 - Runner-up for Leszno
 Team U-21 Polish Championship
 2008 -  Leszno - U-21 Polish Champion for Leszno (15 pts)
 2009 -  Toruń - 3rd place (12 pts)
 Individual Championship of U-21 Speedway Ekstraliga
 2008 -  Leszno - 3rd place (13+2 pts)
 U-21 Speedway Ekstraliga
 2008 - Winner for Leszno
 2009 - Winner for Leszno
 Polish Silver Helmet (U-21)
 2008 -  Rzeszów - qualify to the Final, but he was injury
 2009 -  Częstochowa - qualify to the Final, but he was injury
 Polish Bronze Helmet (U-19)
 2008 -  Gdańsk - qualify to the Final as track reserve, but he was injury
 2009 -  Wrocław - qualify to the Final, but he was injury
 2010 -  Leszno - 3rd placed (13 pts)

See also
 Poland national speedway team (U21, U19)
 Speedway in Poland

References

1991 births
Living people
Polish speedway riders
People from Leszno
Individual Speedway Junior European Champions
Team Speedway Junior World Champions
Team Speedway Junior European Champions
Sportspeople from Greater Poland Voivodeship